James Brown Sings Christmas Songs is the thirteenth  and first Christmas studio album by American musician James Brown. The album was released in November 1966, by King Records.  It charted for 11 weeks peaking at #13 on Billboard's Best Bets For Christmas album chart December 16, 1967.

Track listing

References

1966 albums
1966 Christmas albums
James Brown albums
Albums produced by James Brown
Christmas albums by American artists
King Records (United States) albums
Rhythm and blues Christmas albums